Christos Pierrakos (born 25 January 1940) is a Greek athlete. He competed in the men's javelin throw at the 1964 Summer Olympics. He was named the 1964 Greek Athlete of the Year.

References

1940 births
Living people
Athletes (track and field) at the 1964 Summer Olympics
Greek male javelin throwers
Olympic athletes of Greece
Sportspeople from the Ionian Islands (region)
People from Cephalonia